The Olympus Zuiko Digital ED 50-200mm F2.8-3.5 is an interchangeable lens for Four Thirds system digital single-lens reflex cameras announced by Olympus Corporation during the system launch on June 24, 2003. The SWD version is equipped with an ultrasonic motor for focusing, and was introduced in 2007 with the Olympus E-3.

References
https://web.archive.org/web/20111024173852/http://asia.olympus-imaging.com/products/dslr/lenses/50-200_28-35

External links
 

Camera lenses introduced in 2003
050-200mm 1:2.8-3.5